Steven Russell Trout (born July 30, 1957) is an American former professional baseball pitcher who played Major League Baseball (MLB) during the 1980s.

He is the son of former MLB pitcher Dizzy Trout. He had the nickname "Rainbow".

Career

Chicago White Sox
After attending Thornwood High School in South Holland, Illinois, Trout was drafted by the Chicago White Sox in the first round of the 1976 MLB draft. He played three years in the minor leagues before joining the White Sox and pitching in his first MLB game on July 1, 1978 against the Minnesota Twins.

Chicago Cubs
Before the  season, Trout was traded to the Chicago Cubs along with Warren Brusstar for Scott Fletcher, Pat Tabler, Randy Martz, and Dick Tidrow.  Trout had 32 starts in his first season with the Cubs, going 10-14 with a 4.65 ERA.

They led the Cubs to 96 victories and their first trip to the playoffs in 39 years. Steve pitched the Cubs home opener on April 13 against the New York Mets, pitching a complete game and allowing just two hits in the 11-2 victory. On May 30, Trout took a no-hitter into the eighth inning against the Atlanta Braves that was broken up by Albert Hall.

Trout finished the season with a 13-7 record in 31 starts, posting a 3.41 ERA. Steve pitched effectively in the 1984 National League Championship Series against the San Diego Padres, going 8.1 innings for the victory in Game 2, which put the Cubs one victory away from their first World Series since 1945. He pitched in relief in the series-deciding Game 5 in San Diego, which the Cubs lost.

New York Yankees
Trout's acquisition by the New York Yankees in a mid-season trade proved to be a disastrous trade for the Yankees. Though his last two starts with the Cubs were complete game shutouts, and his ERA was one of the best in the National League, with the Yankees he proved unable to locate the strike zone. He walked 37 batters and threw nine wild pitches in 46 innings and lasted an average of only four innings a start in his nine starts Yankee starts. The Yankees traded Trout to Seattle after the 1987 season, paying the Mariners over one million dollars to offset some of Trout's substantial salary.

Seattle Mariners
Trout was traded to the Mariners before the  season with Henry Cotto in exchange for Lee Guetterman, Clay Parker, and Wade Taylor. He pitched infrequently over the next season and a half before being released by the team.

Retirement
Trout runs a baseball clinic from his home in Venice, Florida from November through April.  It is open to all ages. In 2002, he authored a book about his and his father Dizzy Trout's baseball lives called Home Plate: The Journey of the Most Flamboyant Father and Son Pitching Combination in Major League History.

He has been a pitching coach for the Brockton Rox of the Can-Am League and Chicago's Windy City ThunderBolts of the Frontier League.  On January 25, 2008, it was announced that Trout would be the manager of the Texarkana Gunslingers for their inaugural season 

Moloka'i High School in Hawaii hired Trout in March 2010 to be its head coach. Trout answered an ad in the local newspaper.

He started the Chicago-based Trout Baseball Academy in 2015 and conducts baseball camps for children throughout the year.

Trout recently co-wrote a children's illustration book called Loosey-Goosey Baseball that is available for purchase on his website.

According to the Chicago Sun-Times in 2015, Trout sued a North Side baseball camp claiming the camp unlawfully used his name in the source code of their website for monetary gains.

See also 
 List of second-generation Major League Baseball players

References

External links
 

1957 births
Living people
American expatriate baseball players in Canada
Appleton Foxes players
Baseball players from Michigan
Calgary Cannons players
Chicago Cubs players
Chicago White Sox players
Gulf Coast White Sox players
Iowa Oaks players
Knoxville Sox players
Louisville Redbirds players
Major League Baseball pitchers
New York Yankees players
Peoria Chiefs players
Seattle Mariners players
Baseball players from Detroit